Loryma bilinealis is a species of snout moth in the genus Loryma. It was described by Hans Georg Amsel in 1961 and is known from Iran.

References

Moths described in 1961
Pyralini
Moths of Asia